Gabriel Jules Joseph Piroird, Institute of Prado (5 October 1932 – 3 April 2019) was a French-born Algerian Roman Catholic prelate who served as the fourteenth Diocesan Bishop of the Roman Catholic Diocese of Constantine from 25 March 1983 until his retirement on 21 November 2008.

Biography
Bishop Piroird was born in southern France and as a young person joined a secular institute of the Institute of the Priests of Prado, founded by Blessed Antoine Chevrier, where he was ordained a priest on 27 June 1964, after completing his philosophical and theological education. 

Fr. Piroird worked as a missionary in  Algeria from 1968, after encountering Algerian emigrants in his native Lyons.  Upon his arrival, he served as pastor of Bejaia, in Kabylie, and as engineer in the direction of hydraulics of the wilayah (prefecture). 

On 25 March 1983, after retirement of his predecessor, he was appointed bishop of the Roman Catholic Diocese of Constantine. He was consecrated to the Episcopate on 3 June 1983. The principal consecrator was Bishop Jean Scotto with other prelates of the Roman Catholic Church. 

In this office Bishop Piroird served until his retirement on 21 November 2008, and returned to France, where he died on 3 April 2019.

References

External links
Catholic-Hierarchy 

1932 births
2019 deaths
Clergy from Lyon
20th-century Roman Catholic bishops in Africa
21st-century Roman Catholic bishops in Africa
French Roman Catholic bishops in Africa
French expatriates in Algeria
Roman Catholic bishops of Constantine
Bishops appointed by Pope John Paul II